The Palestra, often called the Cathedral of College Basketball, is a historic arena and the home gym of the Penn Quakers men's and women's basketball teams, volleyball teams, wrestling team, and Philadelphia Big 5 basketball. Located at 235 South 33rd St. in Philadelphia, Pennsylvania on the campus of the University of Pennsylvania, near Franklin Field in the University City section of Philadelphia, it opened on January 1, 1927. The Palestra has been called "the most important building in the history of college basketball" and "changed the entire history of the sport for which it was built".

The arena originally seated about 10,000, but now seats 8,725 for basketball. The Palestra is famed for its close-to-the-court seating with the bleachers ending at the floor with no barrier to separate the fans from the game.

At the time of its construction, the Palestra was one of the world's largest arenas. It was one of the first steel-and-concrete arenas in the United States and also one of the first to be constructed without interior pillars blocking the view.

Since its inception, the Palestra has hosted more games, more visiting teams, and more NCAA tournaments than any other facility in college basketball.

History
 

The building was completed in 1927 and named by Greek professor William N. Bates after the ancient Greek term palæstra, a rectangular enclosure attached to a gymnasium where athletes would compete in various sports in front of an audience. Penn's Palestra was built adjacent to and today is connected to Hutchinson Gymnasium.

The Palestra hosted its first basketball game on January 1, 1927. Pennsylvania defeated Yale 26–15 before a capacity crowd of 10,000, then the largest crowd ever to attend a basketball game on the East Coast.

For many years, the building shared the same management as Madison Square Garden in New York City. Teams wishing to play at the Manhattan venue were often required to schedule a game at the Palestra, which thereby hosted several very high-level sporting events. Many professional games were played at the Palestra before the completion of the Spectrum in 1967. 

The arena hosted the 1968 Intercontinental Cup basketball tournament. 

The Palestra's 50th Anniversary was celebrated on February 10, 1977.

During the 2011 NBA lockout, on September 25, 2011, a team including NBA stars LeBron James, Chris Paul, and Carmelo Anthony, among others, took on Team Philly, a team of NBA players with connections to the Philadelphia area. Team Philly won the game 131–122 in front of 8,725 attendees.

College basketball at the Palestra
 The Palestra has hosted more regular season or post-season NCAA men's basketball games, more visiting teams, and more NCAA tournaments than any other U.S. arena. It is often called "the birthplace of college basketball". It has hosted the East regionals six times (most recently in 1980), and the sub-regionals ten times (most recently in 1984). In total, 52 NCAA Tournament games have been played at the gym since it first came to Penn's campus in 1939.

The Philadelphia Big 5 (Penn, Saint Joseph's, Temple, La Salle, Villanova) originally played all of its games at the Palestra. Today, the intra-city conference still plays about half of its round-robin games there. St. Joseph's hosts its Big 5 games at the gym, which is larger than its own Michael Hagan Arena, formerly Alumni Memorial Fieldhouse. During the 2008-09 basketball season Saint Joseph's played all their home games at the Palestra while the then Alumni Memorial Fieldhouse was undergoing an extensive renovation to become the Hagan Arena.  The annual Battle of 33rd Street between Penn and Drexel was also held at the Palestra until 2013, when the series was suspended due to a location dispute. In 2015, the series resumed; however, it became a home-and-home series alternating between The Palestra and Daskalakis Athletic Center every year.

In addition, parts or all of the 1989-95 Atlantic 10 Conference men's basketball tournaments were contested there, as were the 1985 MEAC men's basketball tournament and the inaugural Ivy League men's and women's tournaments in 2017. The gym has also served as the site of many Philadelphia and PIAA championship games.

The Palestra hosted a Big Ten Conference game between Michigan State and Penn State on January 7, 2017, with the "home-standing" Nittany Lions prevailing 72–63.

The 2017 Ivy League men's basketball tournament (March 11–12, 2017) and the 2018 Ivy League men's basketball tournament (March 10–11, 2018) were held at the Palestra.

2000 renovation

In 2000, a $2 million renovation to the gym added a museum celebrating the history of Philadelphia basketball in the building's main concourse. Near the main entrance to the gym is a section recognizing the St. Joseph's acclaimed Hawk mascot who made its first appearance at the Palestra on Jan. 4, 1956. At the other end of the concourse, by the ramp to sections 211 and 210, a scoreboard lists the all-time record of the Penn-Princeton rivalry. Each decade, from the 1950s onward, has its own exhibit in the concourse. The 1970s section, "A Decade of Prominence", celebrates the Final Four runs by Villanova (1971) and Penn (1979).

In summer 2007, ESPN Classic broadcast a one-hour documentary on the historic arena, entitled "The Palestra: Cathedral of Basketball". This feature-length documentary traces the evolution of college basketball through the rise of the arena. NBA great Bill Bradley, Naismith Hall of Fame Coaches Chuck Daly, Jack Ramsay and John Chaney, best-selling sports author John Feinstein, Penn Band director R. Greer Cheeseman III, and then-CBS/ESPN analyst Bill Raftery are interviewed. The film was written, produced and directed by former Penn Women's Basketball player Mikaelyn Austin (founder of Philly Philms).

See also

Franklin Field
List of NCAA Division I basketball arenas

References

External links

 The Palestra: Cathedral of Basketball - documentary on historic gymnasium, premiered on ESPN
 The Palestra - Penn Athletics
 Five we like, Five we want to see
 Palestra named one of the Top Ten College Sports Venues by Sports Illustrated

1927 establishments in Pennsylvania
Basketball venues in Philadelphia
College basketball venues in the United States
College volleyball venues in the United States
La Salle Explorers men's basketball
NCAA Division I men's basketball tournament Final Four venues
Penn Quakers basketball venues
Philadelphia 76ers venues
Philadelphia Big 5
Saint Joseph's Hawks basketball venues
Sports venues completed in 1927
Temple Owls basketball venues
University of Pennsylvania campus
Wrestling venues in Pennsylvania